This Wonderful Life is the second studio album by Australian singer-songwriter Stephen Cummings. The album was released in August 1986 and peaked at number 69 on the Australian Kent Music Report.

Reception
Toby Crewel from Rolling Stone Australia said "There is a strength that runs through this album which saves the sentiment from becoming maudlin. While Cummings' characters could easily sound resigned, they instead sound strong in their lonesomeness. Cummings' singing sounds stronger than it has in some years and he has a control over the material, exhibiting a dexterity that hasn't been in evidence since The Sports recorded Don't Throw Stones many years ago. Ultimately This Wonderful Life is not a record destined for an immediate impact on the charts. It's too modern, sophisticated, intelligent and passionate for that."

Track listing

Charts

Release history

References 

1986 albums
Stephen Cummings albums
Polydor Records albums